John Finley Crowe (June 16, 1787 - January 17, 1860) was a Presbyterian minister and the founder of Hanover College in Hanover, Indiana.

His residence from 1824 to 1860, the Crowe-Garritt House, was listed on the National Register of Historic Places in 1980.

References

Hanover College
People from Jefferson County, Indiana
1787 births
1860 deaths